"Upside Down" is the debut single from the Scottish alternative rock band The Jesus and Mary Chain. The song was written by William Reid and Jim Reid, and was produced by The Jesus and Mary Chain. The b-side is a cover of a Syd Barrett song and was produced by Joe Foster.

It is the band's only early period release for the Creation Records label. And with about 50,000 copies sold it was the first success for the label.

The sleeves for the first 1.000 copies (in black with red words and an address to write to the band under the credits) were printed by Bobby Gillespie (the next drummer in the band) in Glasgow, and featured handwritten messages from the group. Subsequent copies (without the band address) were produced in several colour variations including red, yellow, blue and pink. In 1985 the single was re-released with a totally different sleeve but the same catalogue number.

Track listing
7" (CRE 012)
"Upside Down" (Jim Reid, William Reid) – 3:00
"Vegetable Man" (Syd Barrett) – 3:35

Personnel

The Jesus and Mary Chain
Jim Reid – vocals, producer
William Reid – guitar, drums, producer
Douglas Hart – bass
Murray Dalglish – drums (credited, but does not play)

Additional personnel
Alan McGee - producer (track 1)
Joe Foster - producer (track 2)

References

The Jesus and Mary Chain songs
1984 debut singles
Creation Records singles
Songs written by Jim Reid
Songs written by William Reid (musician)
1984 songs
UK Independent Singles Chart number-one singles